Jonah Hex: Shadows West is a collection of graphic novels written by American author Joe R. Lansdale. The artwork was done by writer and illustrator Timothy Truman and artist Sam Glanzman. These works were published from 1993 to 1999 by DC Comics. These all surround the adventures of fictional bounty hunter Jonah Hex who was originally created by writer John Albano and artist Tony DeZuniga in 1977. All of the original story and artwork has been redone and reprinted in high quality graphics by Vertigo/DC Comics in 2014.

Contents
1994 Introduction by Joe R. Lansdale
Two Gun mojo
Chapter One: Slow Go Smith
Chapter Two: Invitation to a Hanging
Chapter Three: The Resurrectionist
Chapter Four: Vendetta Times Two
Chapter Five: Showdown
Riders of the Worm and Such
Chapter One: No Rest for the Wicked and the Good don't need any
Chapter Two: Wilde's West
Chapter Three: Big Worm
Chapter Four: Autumns of Our Discontent 
Chapter Five: Cataclysm in Worm Town
Shadows West
Part One: Long Tom
Part two: Gathering Shadows
Part Three: Final Shadows

External links
Joe R. Lansdale's Official Website
Timothy Truman's Official Website
Vertigo Website

References

2014 graphic novels
Works by Joe R. Lansdale
Comics anthologies
DC Comics graphic novels
Jonah Hex